Post hoc (sometimes written as post-hoc) is a Latin phrase, meaning "after this" or "after the event".

Post hoc may refer to:
Post hoc analysis or post hoc test,  statistical analyses that were not specified before the data were seen
Post hoc theorizing, generating hypotheses based on data already observed
Post hoc ergo propter hoc (after this, therefore because of this), a logical fallacy of causation
 "Post Hoc, Ergo Propter Hoc" (The West Wing), an episode of the television series The West Wing

See also
 Propter hoc (disambiguation)
 A priori and a posteriori, Latin phrases used in philosophy meaning "from earlier" and "from later"
Ex post, Latin phrase meaning "after the event"
Ad hoc, a solution designed for a specific problem or task, Latin meaning "for this"